The 1896 East Kerry by-election was held on 27 March 1896 due to the incumbent MP, Michael Davitt of the Irish National Federation also standing in South Mayo and taking that seat so leaving East Kerry vacant.

The Nationalists had split into two factions after the party leader, Charles Stewart Parnell was named as co-respondent in a divorce. James Roche was supported initially by both the Parnellites and the Anti-Parnellites, until it was revealed that he was himself divorced. During the campaign, Roche denied publicly that he knew of the divorce or that he had deserted his wife and children. It was thought Roche lost some support because as a divorced man he was less popular with the Catholic vote. Although he went on to win the seat, the opposing Unionist candidate gained the highest vote ever recorded for a Unionist candidate in Kerry East.

Roche served one term and did not stand in the following general election in 1900.

References

1896 elections in the United Kingdom
By-elections to the Parliament of the United Kingdom in County Kerry constituencies
1896 elections in Ireland